Mace Greenleaf (December 8, 1872 – March 23, 1912) was an American stage and silent film actor.

Early life
Mace Greenleaf was born at Dixfield, Maine, the only child of Charles Ward and Mary (née Eustis) Greenleaf. Charles Greenleaf was a native of Massachusetts and supported his family employed as a surveyor.

Career
Greenleaf's first important role came in the late 1890s playing Herbert, the king's forester, in stock productions of The Prisoner of Zenda and its companion piece Rupert of Hentzau. In 1898, he played Mr. Hunston in Sir Arthur Wing Pinero's play Trelawny of the 'Wells' that opened at the Lyceum Theatre in New York on November 22, 1898. His next Broadway performance was in The Pride of Jennico with James K. Hackett and Bertha Galland staged at the Criterion Theatre in 1900. Later that year, he played Myrtle May's lover in a road production of The Parish Priest with Daniel Sully.

During the first decade of the 20th century, Mace Greenleaf played leading roles in stock companies on both coasts and middle America. He returned to Broadway in 1905 to play the prince of Wales in the romantic musical Edmund Burke. In 1911, he joined the fledgling motion picture industry where he would appear in at least 18 films over the last year or so of his life.

Marriage
In September 1906, Greenleaf married Lucy (aka Lucie) Banning in Santa Ana, California. Banning came from a very wealthy family, they owned Catalina Island, and was remembered at the time for an affair she had while married to her first husband that ended with the suicide of her lover. Lucy Banning was known as something of a free spirit and often scandalized "polite society" with the number of men in her life. She left Greenleaf in 1910 for the son of a prominent judge.

Death
Mace Greenleaf died on March 23, 1912, while in Philadelphia after a brief battle with pneumonia.

Sources

1872 births
1912 deaths
19th-century American male actors
American male stage actors
American male silent film actors
20th-century American male actors
People from Dixfield, Maine
Male actors from Maine
Deaths from pneumonia in Pennsylvania